Herkimer County Jail, also known as the 1834 Jail, is a historic jail in Herkimer, Herkimer County, New York.  It is a two-story structure with high basement, five bays wide, of ashlar limestone blocks with dressed quoins built in 1835.  It features a gable roof with oval window and narrow cornice and a Federal style entrance.  Tours are regularly given by the Herkimer County Historical Society and a museum display highlights the cases of Chester Gillette (the "American Tragedy") and Roxalana Druse.

It was listed on the National Register of Historic Places in 1972.

Gallery

References

External links

Herkimer County Historical Society website

Jails on the National Register of Historic Places in New York (state)
Historic American Buildings Survey in New York (state)
Federal architecture in New York (state)
Government buildings completed in 1835
Infrastructure completed in 1835
Museums in Herkimer County, New York
Prison museums in the United States
History museums in New York (state)
Jails in New York (state)
National Register of Historic Places in Herkimer County, New York